Joseph Norman Robinson (5 January 1921 – 1990) was an English professional footballer who played as a defender.

References

1921 births
1990 deaths
Footballers from Middlesbrough
English footballers
Association football defenders
South Bank St Peters F.C. players
Middlesbrough F.C. players
Grimsby Town F.C. players
English Football League players